Ross Cooke (born 1 February 1988) is an English professional wrestler. He is best known for his time with WWE, where he performed on the NXT UK brand under the ring name Saxon Huxley.

Early life 
Cooke grew up in Greatham, Hartlepool, England. He first saw WWE on Sky TV in early 1992 and cites the Roddy Piper vs. Bret Hart match for the Intercontinental Title at Wrestlemania 8 as the reason he became a lifelong fan of wrestling. He attended Manor College of Technology secondary school. He has a Bachelor of Arts degree from the University of Sunderland.

Professional wrestling career

Early career

Cooke first began professional wrestling training in Calgary, Alberta, Canada where he graduated Lance Storm's Storm Wrestling Academy September 2009 class. He would go on to settle on the ring name Saxon Huxley. In 2013 and 2014 Saxon spent both the entire summers training with Brian Kendrick at the Brian Kendrick School of Pro-Wrestling in Los Angeles, California. He competed on the local independent scene, most notably for Championship Wrestling from Hollywood.  

Huxley was a regular competitor on the British independent circuit from late 2014 onwards, performing for promotions such as Grapple Wrestling, Megaslam Wrestling, and Rise Underground Pro Wrestling.

WWE (2017–2022) 

Saxon made his WWE debut on 14 January, 2017 in the 2017 WWE United Kingdom Championship Tournament. He was eliminated in the first round by Sam Gradwell.

On the 31 October, 2018, episode of NXT UK, Huxley competed in his first match on the NXT UK brand, losing to Trent Seven.

On 18 August 2022, Huxley was released from his WWE contract.

Other media

Saxon featured in the 2018 commercial for Smyths Toys kids game Watermelon Smash.

Championships and accomplishments 

 Rise Underground Pro Wrestling
 Rise Championship (2 times, current)

References

External links 

1988 births
Living people
Sportspeople from London
English male professional wrestlers
Sportspeople from Hartlepool